Claus Koch (born 27 April 1953) is a German former sports shooter. He competed at the 1976 Summer Olympics for West Germany.

References

1953 births
Living people
German male sport shooters
Olympic shooters of West Germany
Shooters at the 1976 Summer Olympics
People from Kempten im Allgäu
Sportspeople from Swabia (Bavaria)